The Shatapatha Brahmana (meaning 'Brāhmaṇa of one hundred paths', abbreviated to 'SB') is a commentary on the Śukla (white) Yajurveda. It is attributed to the Vedic sage Yajnavalkya. Described as the most complete, systematic, and important of the Brahmanas (commentaries on the Vedas), it contains detailed explanations of Vedic sacrificial rituals, symbolism, and mythology.

Particularly in its description of sacrificial rituals (including construction of complex fire-altars), the Shatapatha Brahmana (SB) provides scientific knowledge of geometry (e.g. calculations of pi and the root of the Pythagorean theorem) and observational astronomy (e.g. planetary distances and the assertion that the Earth is circular) from the Vedic period.

The Shatapatha Brahmana is also considered to be significant in the development of Vaishnavism as the origin of several Puranic legends and avatars of the RigVedic god Vishnu. Notably, all of them (Matsya, Kurma, Varaha, Narasimha, and Vamana) are listed as the first five avatars in the Dashavatara (the ten principal avatars of Vishnu).

There are two versions (recensions) available of this text. They are the Madhyandina recension and the Kanva recension. This article focuses exclusively on the  Madhyandina version of the Shatapatha Brahmana.

Nomenclature 
The 'Shatapatha Brahmana' (Sanskrit शतपथब्राह्मण) can be loosely translated as 'Brahmana of one hundred paths':

'Brahmana' (Sanskrit ब्राह्मण) means 'explanations of sacred knowledge or doctrine'.
'Shatapatha' (Sanskrit शतपथ) means 'having a hundred paths' or  'proceeding in a hundred ways'.

Kanda and Adhyâya 

 'Kanda' (or 'Khanda', Sanskrit खंड), means 'chapter', 'division of a book', or more loosely 'book'. It also means 'praise' and 'water'.
 'Adhyâya' (Sanskrit अध्याय), means 'chapter' (of a book), 'lesson', 'reading' and 'lecture'.

In relation to the Shatapatha Brahmana, a reference such as '14.1.2' means 'Kanda 14, Adhyaya 1, Brahmana 2', or in English, 'Book 14, Chapter 1, Explanation 2'. The addition of a fourth digit at the end (e.g. 17.7.3.11) refers to the verse number.

Date 
Arthur Berriedale Keith states that linguistically, the Shatapatha Brahmana belongs to the later part of the Brāhmaṇa period of Vedic Sanskrit (8th to 6th centuries BCE, Iron Age India). M. Witzel dates this text to the 7th-6th centuries BCE. Jan N. Bremmer dates it to around 700 BCE. J. Eggeling (translator of the Vājasaneyi mādhyandina recension into English), dates the final, written version of the text to 300 BCE, although stating some elements 'far older, transmitted orally from unknown antiquity'.

B. N. Narahari Achar also notes several other estimations, such as that of S.B. Dixit, D. Pingree, and N. Achar, in relation to a statement in the text that the Krittikas (the open star cluster Pleiades) never deviate from the east; Dixit's interpretation of this statement to mean that the Krittikas rise exactly in the east, and calculated that the Krittikas were on the celestial equator at about 3000 BCE, is a subject of debate between the named scholars; Pingree rejects Dixit’s arguments.

Subhash Kak states that a 'conservative chronology places the final form of the Shatapatha Brahmana to 1000-800 B.C.E... [although on] the other hand, it is accepted that the events described in the Vedas and the Brahmanas deal with astronomical events of the 4th millennium [i.e. 3,000] B.C.E. and earlier'. According to Kak, the Shatapatha Brahmana itself contains astronomical references dated by academics such as P.C. Sengupta 'to c. 2100 B.C.E', and references the drying up of the Sarasvati river, believed to have occurred around 1900 B.C.E:

Scholars have extensively rejected Kak's arguments; Witzel criticizes Kak for "faulty reasoning" and taking "a rather dubious datum and us[ing] it to reinterpret Vedic linguistic, textual, ritual history while neglect[ing] all the other contradictory data." According to Witzel, the Shatapatha Brahmana does not contain precise contemporary astronomical records, but rather only approximate naked-eye observations for ritual concerns which likely reflect oral remembrances of older time periods; furthermore, the same general observations are recorded in the Babylonian MUL.APIN tablets of c. 1000 BCE. The Shatapatha Brahmana contains clear references to the use of iron, so it cannot be dated earlier than c. 1200-1000 BCE, while it reflects cultural, philosophical, and socio-political developments that are later than other Iron Age texts (such as the Atharvaveda) and only slightly earlier than the time of the Buddha (c. 5th century BCE).

Content and Recensions 
According to the Indira Gandhi National Centre for the Arts (IGNCA), the Shatapatha Brahmana survives in two recensions:

The 14 books of the Madhyandina recension can be divided into two major parts. The first 9 books have close textual commentaries, often line by line, of the first 18 books of the corresponding samhita of the Śukla (white) Yajurveda. The remaining 5 books of the Shatapatha cover supplementary and ritualistically newer material; the content of the 14th and last book constitutes the Bṛhad-Āraṇyaka Upaniṣad. The IGNCA also provides further structural comparison between the recensions, noting that the 'names of the Kandas also vary between the two (versions) and the sequence in which they appear':

The IGNCA adds that 'the division of Kandika is more rational in the Kanva text than in the other... The name 'Shatapatha', as Eggeling has suggested, might have been based on the number of Adhyayas in the Madhyandina which is exactly one hundred. But the Kanva recension, which has one hundred and four Adhyayas is also known by the same name. In Indian tradition words like 'sata' and 'sahasra', indicating numbers, do not always stand for exact numbers'.

Brihadaranayaka Upanishad 

The Brihadaranyaka Upanishad is from the last Kanda (i.e. book 17) of the Kanva recension of the Shatapatha Brahmana. Swami Madhavananda states that this Upanishad is 'the greatest of the Upanishads... not only in extent; but it is also the greatest in respect of its substance and theme. It is the greatest Upanishad in the sense that the illimitable, all-embracing, absolute, self-luminous, blissful reality - the Brhat or Brahman, identical with Atman, constitutes its theme'.

Significance in science

Astronomy 
Kak elaborates that 'the main elements of the astronomy of [the] Vedanga Jyotisa [one of the earliest known Vedic texts on astronomy] are already contained in [the] Satapatha Brahmana and earlier books'. He adds that Vedic ritual sacrifices (yajna) described in texts such as the Shatapatha Brahmana are intended to capture 'time in motion', noting some rituals lasted an entire year.

In relation to sacrifice and astronomical phenomena detailed in texts such as the Shatapatha Brahmana (e.g. sacrifices performed during the waxing and waning of the moon), N. Aiyangar states the fact that 'the Vedic people had a celestial [i.e. astronomical] counterpart of their sacrificial ground is clear', and cites an example of the YajnaVaraha sacrifice in relation to the constellation of Orion. Roy elaborates further on this example, stating that when 'the sun became united with Orion at the vernal equinox...[this] commenced the yearly [YajnaVaraha] sacrifice'. The vernal (March) equinox marks the onset of spring, and is celebrated in Indian culture as the Holi festival (the spring festival of colours).

I.G. Pearce states that the Shatapatha Brahmana - along with other Vedic texts such as the Vedas, Samhitas, and Tattiriya Samhita - evidences 'the astronomy of the Vedic period which, given very basic measuring devices (in many cases just the naked eye), gave surprisingly accurate values for various astronomical quantities. These include the relative size of the planets the distance of the earth from the sun, the length of the day, and the length of the year'. A.A. Macdonell adds that the Shatapatha in particular is notable as - unlike the Samhitas -  in it the Earth was 'expressly called circular (parimandala)'.

Mathematics 

In the construction of fire altars  used for sacrifices, Kak also notes the importance of the number, configuration, measurements, and patterns of bricks representing factors such as:

Vedic Meters: The rhythmic structure of verses in sacred utterances or mantras, particularly from the RigVeda
Area/size and numeric equivalences: Units of time such as Muhurtas, months, seasons, and days; and Vedic numerology, an example being the Falcon altar (see left image), which was constructed from five layers of 200 bricks each, the total 1,000 bricks symbolising the Purusha, the first principle of creation, enumerated in the RigVeda (10.90):

Notably, P. N. Sinha states that the number 1,000 represents 'the thousand Maha yugas of every Kalpa' (about 4.32 billion years), illustrated by the 1,000 hoods of the Naga Vasuki/Ananta on which the Earth is supported. I.G. Pearce, F. Staal, and D.M. Knipe all agree with Kak, repeating that the number, layering, size, and configuration of bricks to construct sacrificial altars - real and symbolic - as detailed in texts such as the Shatapatha Brahmana had numerous rules, with Staal adding - in relation to similarities with ancient Greek, Babylonian, and Chinese geometry:

Noting that Kak also provides three values for Pi (the ratio of the circumference of a circle to its diameter) from the Shatapatha Brahmana, Pearce elaborates on the advancement of Vedic mathematics in general in relation to the construction of sacrificial altars:

C.S. Seshadri states 'Familiarity with the four fundamental operations of arithmetic is evidence in Vedic Literature like the Shatapatha Brahmana, the Taittiriya Samhita and even the Rg-Veda. A passage from the ancient Shatapatha Brahmana gives all divisors of 720'. This passage (10.4.2.1-18) is  noted by Kak as having 'exactly 15 factors (1, 2, 3, 4, 5, 6, 8, 9, 10, 12, 15, 16, 18, 20, 24)'. The significance of this (including in relation to astronomy) can be seen in the following verses of that passage:

Significance in Vaishnavism 

A.A. Macdonell, A.B. Keith, J. Roy, J. Dowson, W.J. Wilkins, S. Ghose, M.L. Varadpande, N Aiyangar, and D.A. Soifer all state that several avatars and associated Puranic legends of Vishnu either originate (e.g. Matsya, Kurma, Varaha, and Narasimha) or at least were significantly developed (e.g. Vamana) in the Shatapatha Brahmana (SB). Notably, all constitute the first five avatars listed in the Dashavatara, the ten principal avatars of Vishnu.

Vishnu 
Sofia states ''developments that occur in the general character of Visnu in the Brahmana literature have far-reaching influence on the growth and moulding of avataric Visnu... Probably the single most important development, which is first found in the Brahmanas and exerts the most influence over all other factors, is the identification of Vishnu with the sacrifice'. Vishnu is explicitly stated to be sacrifice repeatedly throughout the Shatapatha Brahmana (e.g. SB 1.7.4.20, 1.1.4.9, 3.2.1.38, 3.6.3.3, 5.2.3.6, 5.4.5.1, 5.4.5.18, 11.4.1.4, 12.5.4.11, 14.1.1.13, and 11.4.1.4).

Kanda 14, Adhyaya 1, Brahmana 1 
in SB 14.1.1 ('The Pravargya'), the story given is that 'the gods Agni, Indra, Soma, Makha, Vishnu, and the [Visvedevas], except the two Asvins, performed a sacrificial session', which was first attained by Vishnu, hence 'he became the most excellent of the gods'. Upadika ants then agreed with the other gods to gnaw at the bowstring of Vishnu while He rested his head on the Bow, in exchange for the boon to 'find water even in the desert' (as 'all food is water'). The Gharma (hot beverage offered as an oblation) is named after the sound of Vishnu's head hitting the ground (which 'on falling became yonder sun'), and 'inasmuch as he [Vishnu] stretched out (pra-vrig) on the ground, therefrom the Pravargya (took its name)'. The body of Vishnu is encompassed by Indra, who possessed by His glory 'became Makhavat (possessed of makha)'. Vishnu is then divided into three parts, with Agni receiving the first (morning) portion, Indra the second (midday) portion, and the remaining Visvedevas the third portion.

Kurma 

Kurma, the tortoise avatar of Vishnu, is inextricably linked in the Puranas with the legend of the churning of the Ocean of Milk, referred to as the Samudra manthan. The tortoise avatar is also synonymous with Akupara, the 'world-turtle' supporting the Earth, as well as the Saptarishi sage, Kasyapa. Accounts from the Shatapatha Brahmana are stated by Varadpande to be the seed of Kurma.

Eggeling adds that the 'kapalas [cups used in ritual sacrifices] are usually arranged in such a manner as to produce a fancied resemblance to the (upper) shell of the tortoise, which is a symbol of the sky, as the tortoise itself represents the universe... In the same way the term kapala, in the singular, is occasionally applied to the skull, as well as to the upper and the lower case of the tortoise, e.g. Sat Br. VII, 5, 1, 2 [7.5.1.2].'

Kanda 1, Adhyaya 6, Brahmana 2 

Macdonell also notes another instance in the Taittiriya Samhita (2.6.3; relating to the Krishna (Black) YajurVeda), where Prajapati assigns sacrifices for the gods and places the oblation within himself, before Risis arrive at the sacrifice and 'the sacrificial cake (purodasa) is said to become a tortoise'.

Kanda 6, Adhyaya 1, Brahmana 1 

Vak (speech) is female (e.g. SB 1.2.5.15, 1.3.3.8, 3.2.1.19, 3.2.1.22). Used in ritual sacrifices, so is the sacrificial altar (Vedi; SB 3.5.1.33, 3.5.1.35), the spade (abhri; SB 3.5.4.4, 3.6.1.4, 3.7.1.1, 6.3.1.39; see section on Varaha, below), and the firepan (ukha; SB 6.6.2.5). The (generative) principle of gender (i.e. male and female coupling to produce something) is pervasive throughout (as reflected by the Sanskrit language itself).

Kanda 7, Adhyaya 5, Brahmana 1 

Originally a form of Prajapati, the creator-god, the tortoise is thus clearly and directly linked with Vedic ritual sacrifice, the sun, and with Kasyapa as a creator (or progenitor). The tortoise is also stated to represent the three worlds (i.e. the triloka). SB 5.1.3.9-10 states 'Pragapati (the lord of generation) represents productiveness... the male means productiveness'. SB 14.1.1, which relates the story of Vishnu becoming the greatest of the gods at a sacrifice of the gods before being decapitated by His bow, states the head of Vishnu became the sun when it fell.

Matsya 

Matsya, the fish avatar of Vishnu, appears to Manu to warn him of an impending deluge. After being reared by and growing to an enormous size, Matsya then guides Manu's ship to safety at the peak of a mountain, where Manu re-establishes life through the performance of Vedic sacrificial rites (yajna). In Puranic accounts, Matsya also rescues the Vedas taken under the water, after they were stolen from Brahma by the Asura called Hayagriva (not to be confused with Hayagriva, the horse-headed avatar of Vishnu). From the Shatapatha Brahmana:

Aiyangar explains that, in relation to the RigVeda, 'Sacrifice is metaphorically called [a] Ship and as Manu means man, the thinker, [so] the story seems to be a parable of the Ship of Sacrifice being the means for man's crossing the seas of his duritas, [meaning his] sins, and troubles'. SB 13.4.3.12 also mentions King Matsya Sammada, whose 'people are the water-dwellers... both fish and fishermen... it is these he instructs; - 'the Itihasa is the Veda'.'

Narasimha 

Narasimha destroyed the Asura-King Hiranyakashipu, who after undertaking severe penances, was granted a boon by Brahma that he could not be killed inside or outside any residence, on the ground or in the sky, or by any god, human, animal, or weapon. The man-lion avatar of Vishnu thus put the demon on His lap and killed him with claws. This concept is similar to that found in the Shatapatha brahmana (Sanskrit transliteration for Kanda XII is not available):

D.A. Soifer states that 'Brahmana literature yields what must be considered as the prototype of that [Narasimha] myth, the Indra-Namuchi [or Namuki] myth', adding that other academics such as Devasthali concur that although elements of the Namuchi legend are 'scattered throughout Brahmana literature (cf. VS [Vajaseneyi Samhita] 10.34; PB [Pancavimsa Brahmana] 12.6.8, MS [Maitrayani Samhita] IV.34; TB [Taittiriya Brahmana] 1.7.1.6)', the fullest version is in the Shatapatha Brahmana. Indra defeating Namuchi itself originates from the RigVeda (e.g. 10.73):

Vamana 

Vamana, the dwarf avatar of Vishnu, took back the three worlds from the Asura king Bali (grandson of Prahlada, saved from his father, Hiranyakashipu, by the Narasimha avatar) in three steps.

Kanda I, Adhyaya 2, Brahmana 5 

Eggeling notes that in the Shatapatha Brahmana, 'we have here the germ [i.e. origin] of the Dwarf incarnation of Vishnu'. The difference in this account - aside from no mention of Bali - is that instead of gaining the earth by footsteps, it is gained by as much as Vamana can lie upon as a sacrifice. That this legend developed into Vamana taking three steps, as noted by Aiyangar, originates from the three strides of Vishnu covering the three words in the RigVeda (1.22 and 1.154). Notably, the three steps of Vishnu are mentioned throughout the Shatapatha Brahmana as part of the sacrificial rituals described (e.g. SB 1.9.3.12, 5.4.2.6, and 6.7.4.8).

Kanda 6, Adhyaya 7, Brahmana 4 
SB 6.7.4.8 also explains why the strides of Vishnu are performed in rituals:

Varaha 

Varaha - also referred to as Yajna-Varaha ('sacrificial boar') - is in Puranic literature explicitly stated to be the symbolic embodiment of sacrifice (including the ritual equipment, offerings, oblations, and altars used). Stated in the Nirukta to be synonymous with clouds and rain (sacrifice produces rain, rain feeds crops, and crops feed living beings), Varaha is most commonly associated with the legend of lifting the Earth out of the Cosmic Waters, and in various accounts also battles and defeats the Asura Hiranyaksa to do so.

Kanda 14, Adhyaya 1, Brahmana 2 

The context of this verse is in relation to a Pravargya ritual, where clay/earth is dug up, fashioned or 'spread out' into Mahâvîra pots (symbolising the head of Vishnu), and baked in a fire altar (an explanation of Vishnu's decapitation relating to this ritual is given in SB 14.1.1). S. Ghose states that the 'first direct idea of the boar as an incarnation of Vishnu performing the specific task of rescuing the earth is mentioned in the Shatapatha Brahmana... the nucleus of the story of the god rescuing the earth in the boar-shape is found here'. A.B. Keith states that the boar 'is called Emusa [or 'Emûsha' in the SB] from its epithet emusa, [meaning] fierce, in the RigVeda'. However, as this name occurs only once in the RigVeda, the ascribed meaning cannot be verified:

Kanda 5, Adhyaya 4, Brahmana 3 

The form of a boar was produced from a sacrificial oblation of the gods, and boars share the essence of cattle (which symbolise prosperity and sacrifice in SB 3.1.4.14, and productiveness in 5.2.5.8). Eggeling notes that in this ceremony, the King wears boar-boots to engage in a mock-battle with a Raganya (a Kshatriya noble or royal), stated to be 'Varuna's consecration; and the Earth is afraid of him'. This ritual therefore seems to be significant as the mock-battle between the King (symbolising the boar) and the Raganya (symbolising Varuna, RigVedic deity of water) parallels the battle between Varaha with the Asura Hiranyaksa in various Puranic accounts of the Earth being saved and lifted out of the waters.

Manuscripts and Translations 
All English translations of the Madhyandina School recension are by Julius Eggeling in five volumes. The English translation of the Kanva School recension by W.E. Caland in 3 volumes has not been found or listed; another English translation by the Indira Gandhi National Centre for the Arts (IGNCA) in at least seven volumes has been listed (only the first five volumes can be previewed).

See also
Brahmana
Dashavatara
Yajnavalkya
Yajurveda

Footnotes

References

Brahmanas